The Omnisport Apeldoorn, also known as the Omnisportcentrum or simply called Omnisport, is a velodrome and multisport indoor arena in Apeldoorn, the Netherlands.

Designed by FaulknerBrowns Architects the facility opened in 2008, it is divided into two halls: a cycling hall containing  cycling track and  athletics track, and a volleyball hall. The cycling hall has a capacity for 5,000 spectators and the volleyball hall for 2,000. The complex has been operated by Libéma since 2012.

Usage and events
In addition to its function as sports accommodation, Omnisport is used for business events such as fairs, congresses and meetings, and various public events such as music concerts. In 2013, a wing was added to the center that houses the De Voorwaarts shopping center. Besides the Omnisport Centre, there is a skating rink. It was designed to be used as an ice-skating rink for six weeks every winter.

Sporting

Omnisport Apeldoorn is used during the day by educational institution ROC Aventus and has been the home of volleyball club SV Dynamo. The cycling hall was the host of the 2011 UCI Track Cycling World Championships, 2015 UCI Track Para-Cycling World Championships, in May 2016 it hosted the opening time-trial stage of the 2016 Giro d'Italia and in 2018 it hosted 2018 UCI Track Cycling World Championships.

Major volleyball events are held in the cycling hall, setting up the court and temporary grandstands in the central area of the velodrome, and can have a capacity of between 5,000 and 6,500 spectators. In the volleyball competitions, this arena was one of the venues of the 2015 Women's European Volleyball Championship, 2019 Men's European Volleyball Championship and the final round of the 2022 FIVB Volleyball Women's World Championship.

See also
 List of cycling tracks and velodromes
 List of indoor arenas in the Netherlands

External links

Indoor arenas in the Netherlands
Velodromes in the Netherlands
Volleyball venues in the Netherlands
Cycle racing in the Netherlands
Sports venues in Gelderland
Buildings and structures in Apeldoorn
Sport in Apeldoorn
Cycling in Apeldoorn
Sports venues completed in 2008
2008 establishments in the Netherlands
21st-century architecture in the Netherlands